The List: What's In and Out is a U.S. pop culture list published annually by The Washington Post newspaper, on or near New Year's Day in the Style section.  It was started by the paper's fashion editor, Nina Hyde, in 1977, and tended to by various former and current Post writers after Hyde's death in 1990, including Martha Sherrill, Cathy Horyn and Robin Givhan. From 2003 to 2009 The List was written by staff writer Hank Stuever.  In 2010, Washington Post staff writers Monica Hesse and Dan Zak co-authored The List, which itemizes people, places, things, and even ideas-and rates them as either "out" (not popular, not fun, not recommended) or "in" (popular, fun, and recommended).

The list has been criticized for being mostly or completely subjective.  Sometimes a person has been considered both "Out" and "In" (for example, Madonna in 1985 and Al Gore in 2007).  At other times, the list makes indirect references to people; also in 2007, listed as "Out" is "Wrestling-coach voice" (this is a veiled reference to out-going Republican House Speaker Dennis Hastert) while listed as "In" is "Mother-of-five voice" (a veiled reference to in-coming Democratic House Speaker Nancy Pelosi).

"Out" and "In" for 2007
The following is a partial list of things "Out" and "In" for 2007:

"Out" and "In" for 2008
The following is a partial list of things "Out" and "In" for 2008:

"Out" and "In" for 2009
The following is a partial list of things "Out" and "In" for 2009:

"Out" and "In" for 2010
The following is a partial list of things "Out" and "In" for 2010:

"Out" and "In" for 2011
The following is a partial list of things "Out" and "In" for 2011:

"Out" and "In" for 2012
The following is a partial list of things "Out" and "In" for 2012:

See also
 The Washington Post
 Hank Stuever
 Style
 Pop culture
 2006
 2007
 2008
 2009
 2010
 2011

External links
 The Official "In and Out" List for 2007
 The Official "In and Out" List for 2008
 The Official "In and Out" List for 2009
 The Official "In and Out" List for 2010
 The Official "In and Out" List for 2011
 The Official "In and Out" List for 2012

2006 in the United States
2007 in the United States
2008 in the United States
2009 in the United States
2010 in the United States
2011 in the United States
2012 in the United States
American culture